Robert  or Bobby Abel may refer to:

Robert Abel (footballer), English professional footballer
Bobby Abel (1857–1936), English cricketer
Robert Abel (animator) (1937–2001), American visual effects engineer
Robert Abel and Associates, company owned by the above
Robert H. Abel (1941–2017), American short story writer